Nawaf Al-Otaibi (born 22 September 1993) is a Saudi Arabian professional footballer who plays as a goalkeeper for MS League club Al-Sahel.

Career
Al-Otaibi started his career in the youth team of Al-Shoulla. On 26 June 2013, Al-Otaibi joined the U23 team of Al-Nassr. He spent two years at Al-Nassr, before joining Al-Mujazzal. Following Al-Mujazzal's relegation to the Second Division, Al-Otaibi joined Hajer on a two-year contract. On 11 June 2018, Al-Otaibi renewed his contract with Hajer keeping him at the club until the end of the 2018–19 season. Following Hajer's relegation to the Second Division, Al-Otaibi joined Al-Nahda. On 29 June 2022, Al-Otaibi joined Al-Sahel.

References

External links
 
 

1993 births
Living people
Saudi Arabian footballers
Association football goalkeepers
Saudi First Division League players
Al-Shoulla FC players
Al Nassr FC players
Al-Mujazzal Club players
Hajer FC players
Al-Nahda Club (Saudi Arabia) players
Al-Sahel SC (Saudi Arabia) players